The 2010 Velayat International Cup was a football tournament held in Iran that was played in Tehran

Group A

Group B

Final

Top goalscorers 
Abbas Mohammad Rezaei (4 goals)

References
Football Tehran

2010
2010–11 in Iranian football